The Roman Catholic Diocese of Cuernavaca (erected 23 June 1891) is a suffragan diocese of the Archdiocese of Toluca. Its seat is in the Cuernavaca Cathedral. S.E.R. Mons. Ramón Castro Castro was named 12th Bishop of Cuernavaca by Pope Francis on May 15, 2013.

Ordinaries
Fortino Hipólito Vera y Talonia (1894–1898).
Francisco Plancarte y Navarrete (1898–1911), appointed Archbishop of Linares o Nueva León, Nuevo León.  
Manuel Fulcheri y Pietrasanta (1912–1922), appointed Bishop of Zamora, Michoacán.
Francisco Uranga y Sáenz (1922–1930).
Francisco María González y Arias (1931–1946).
Alfonso Espino y Silva (1947–1951), appointed Coadjutor Archbishop of Monterrey, Nuevo León.
Sergio Méndez Arceo (1952–1982).
Juan Jesús Posadas Ocampo (1982–1987), appointed Archbishop of Guadalajara, Jalisco, México; elevated to Cardinal in 1991.
Luis Reynoso Cervantes (1987–2000). 
Florencio Olvera Ochoa (2002–2009).
Alfonso Cortes Contreras (2009–2012), appointed Archbishop of León, Guanajuato.
S.E.R. Mons. Ramón Castro Castro (2012–present)

Episcopal See
Cuernavaca, Morelos

External links and references

Cuernavaca
Religious organizations established in 1891
Roman Catholic dioceses and prelatures established in the 19th century
Cuernavaca, Roman Catholic Diocese of
Morelos
1891 establishments in Mexico